The Honkbal Overgangsklasse (Dutch for Baseball Transition League) is the second highest level of professional baseball in the Netherlands. It is a twelve-team league that plays a 22-game schedule followed by two separate 15-game schedules for the best six teams and the weakest six teams, and is overseen by the KNBSB. Games are played principally on weekends. The season runs from April to August and is followed by a promotion and relegation system with the highest level of baseball in the Netherlands, the Honkbal Hoofdklasse, so that the composition of the top level may change from year to year.

2011 season
The 2011 Honkbal Overgangsklasse season began April 8, 2011.

22-game schedule

15-game schedule

Top six teams
The 2011 Honkbal Overgangsklasse 1–6 (best teams) season began June 25, 2011 and ended September 4, 2011.

Bottom six teams
The 2011 Honkbal Overgangsklasse 7–12 (weakest teams) season began June 25, 2011 and ended September 4, 2011.

See also
Baseball in the Netherlands
Baseball awards #Netherlands
Baseball awards #Europe

External links
Official website Koninklijke Nederlandse Baseball en Softball Bond (KNBSB)
De Nederlandse honkbalsite

References

Baseball competitions in the Netherlands
Baseball leagues in Europe
Professional sports leagues in the Netherlands